Andra Simons is a Bermudian writer, director and actor now residing in London.

Biography 
Born in Bermuda, Simons graduated from George Brown Theatre School in Toronto, Ontario, Canada. He was well known in the spoken-word movement in Toronto, notably for his collaboration with Sandra Alland in the performance poetry-music band Stumblin' Tongues. In 1997 Simons returned to Bermuda, where in 1999 he co-founded Waterspout Theatre company. He settled in the UK in 2004, and now focuses on poetry and performance.

His first volume, The Joshua Tales, was published by Treehouse Press in 2009, and features collagraphs by Kendra Ezekiel. The work describes the relationship between a poet and another figure, Joshua, who can be seen as a little boy or the poet's shadow, and is set on the fictional island of Pocaroja. One reviewer, on Goodreads, called the book "startling, shocking and brilliant. Indeed mysterious and magical (and controversial)".

Simons was selected to represent Bermuda in "Poetry Parnassus", an international gathering of poets at London’s Southbank Centre in June 2012, featuring one poet from each of the 204 nations competing in the 2012 Summer Olympics.

References

Works 
 Turtlemen, London and Isle of Wight: Copy Press, 2021
 The Joshua Tales, London: Treehouse Press, 2009
 Some Poems by People I Like (editor Sandra Alland), Toronto: sandraslittlebookshop, 2007
 Partings (with Sandra Alland), Toronto: Stumblin' Tongues, 1998

External links 
 Andra Simons website.
 Vejay Steede, "World-class poet’s triumphant return", The Royal Gazette, 20 September 2011. Interview with Andra Simons.
 Sophie Mayer, Review of The Joshua Tales, Chroma, 1 May 2010.

Living people
Bermudian writers
Black British writers
Spoken word poets
British performance artists
Year of birth missing (living people)